Aglossorrhyncha is a genus of flowering plants from the orchid family Orchidaceae. It contains 13 currently recognized species, native to eastern Indonesia, New Guinea, and various islands in the Pacific Ocean.

Aglossorrhyncha aurea Schltr. in K.M.Schumann & C.A.G.Lauterbach  - New Guinea,  Bismarcks, Solomons
Aglossorrhyncha biflora J.J.Sm. - Maluku, New Guinea, Solomons, Fiji, Vanuatu 
Aglossorrhyncha bilobula Kores - Fiji
Aglossorrhyncha fruticicola J.J.Sm. - New Guinea
Aglossorrhyncha galanthiflora J.J.Sm. - New Guinea
Aglossorrhyncha jabiensis J.J.Sm. - New Guinea
Aglossorrhyncha lucida Schltr. - New Guinea
Aglossorrhyncha lucida var. dischorensis Schltr.
Aglossorrhyncha lucida var. lucida
Aglossorrhyncha lucida var. wariana Schltr.
Aglossorrhyncha micronesiaca Schltr. - Palau
Aglossorrhyncha peculiaris J.J.Sm. - New Guinea
Aglossorrhyncha serrulata Schltr. - New Guinea
Aglossorrhyncha stenophylla Schltr. - New Guinea
Aglossorrhyncha torricellensis Schltr. - New Guinea
Aglossorrhyncha viridis Schltr.  - New Guinea

See also 
 List of Orchidaceae genera

References 

 Pridgeon, A.M., Cribb, P.J., Chase, M.A. & Rasmussen, F. eds. (1999). Genera Orchidacearum 1. Oxford Univ. Press.
 Pridgeon, A.M., Cribb, P.J., Chase, M.A. & Rasmussen, F. eds. (2001). Genera Orchidacearum 2. Oxford Univ. Press.
 Pridgeon, A.M., Cribb, P.J., Chase, M.A. & Rasmussen, F. eds. (2003). Genera Orchidacearum 3. Oxford Univ. Press
 Berg Pana, H. 2005. Handbuch der Orchideen-Namen. Dictionary of Orchid Names. Dizionario dei nomi delle orchidee. Ulmer, Stuttgart

External links 

Arethuseae genera
Coelogyninae